The year 1738 in science and technology involved some significant events.

Astronomy
 Pierre Louis Maupertuis publishes Sur la figure de la terre, which confirms Newton's view that the Earth is an oblate spheroid slightly flattened at the poles.

Botany
 Publication of Hortus Cliffortianus, a detailed description by Linnaeus of George Clifford's gardens at Hartekamp, Netherlands, including the raising of exotic plants such as bananas in a greenhouse.

Mathematics

Medicine
 February – Great Plague of 1738, an outbreak of bubonic plague, begins to spread from Banat across central Europe.
 Establishment of The Mineral Water Hospital in Bath, England.

Metallurgy
 July 1 – William Champion of Bristol patents a process to distill zinc from calamine using charcoal in a smelter.

Technology
 June 24 – Lewis Paul and John Wyatt obtain a British patent for roller cotton-spinning machinery.
 Jacques de Vaucanson presents the world's first automaton, The Flute Player (1737) to the French Academy of Sciences.
 Black Forest clockmaker Franz Ketterer produces one of the earliest cuckoo clocks.

Awards
 Copley Medal: James Valoue

Births
 November 15 – William Herschel, German-born astronomer (died 1822)

Deaths
 June 21 – Charles Townshend, 2nd Viscount Townshend, English agriculturalist (born 1674)
 September 23 – Herman Boerhaave, Dutch physician (born 1668)

References

 
18th century in science
1730s in science